The Regalado Highway, officially named as Regalado Avenue (North), four-to-six-lane highway connecting Quirino Highway with Commonwealth Avenue. It is a main thoroughfare in the Barangay Greater Lagro to Mindanao Avenue and of the Neopolitan Business Park. It is named Regalado Highway to distinguish it from the nearby Regalado Avenue which is also a main road in the North Fairview area.

References

Streets in Quezon City